Nottingham City Police, originally founded as the Borough of Nottingham Police, was a UK police force created under the Municipal Corporations Act 1835 in the style of Robert Peel's Metropolitan Police which initially launched in 1836. This initial force failed and was re-founded successfully in 1841. It had responsibility for law enforcement within the geographic area as defined by the boundaries of the city of Nottingham.
Under the Police Act 1964 the force was compulsorily amalgamated with Nottinghamshire County Police to form the Nottinghamshire Combined Constabulary, now re-named Nottinghamshire Police.

Founding and early history 
The force was founded originally in 1836 with a body of 3 police officers working days and 12 police officers working evenings. The previously existing system of night watchmen was retained for the hours of darkness. The force operated under the existing High Constable William Barnes who had held the traditional position of authority in the borough since 1833. The force failed after 5 years, with internal rivalries between the different shifts and general incompetence on the parts of the watchmen leading to its lack of efficiency.

Trips by the town's authorities to neighbouring Derby to observe their new police force in action prompted the Nottingham Corporation to disband the force baring the three 'day police' officers. They re-launched a new force in 1841 with 47 officers, including 1 Inspector and 12 Constables for the day and 4 Inspectors and 30 Constables for nights. When this force hit the beat they were far more successful.

The force was further reviewed in 1851 and expanded to now 2 Inspectors, 5 Sergeants and 53 Constables. It would also now have a Superintendent “who shall have no other duties than the management of the Police Force”. Supt. William Reddish was appointed at a salary of £150 plus house and coal. William Barnes retained his position as High Constable but had no more involvement with running the force. The review also introduced a Criminal Investigation Department to the force for the first time.

List of Chief Constables

The Popkess Era 
Between 1930 - 1959 the Nottingham City Police force was run by Chief Constable Capt Athelstan Popkess. This was a golden age for the force where it achieved national fame as being a pioneer in advancing police technology and being recognised as a national example to follow in many areas.

Popkess was responsible for introducing a plethora of innovations to the police, including introducing the first police forensic science laboratory in the UK located in Nottingham's Central Police Station. The force also pioneered the use of police radios through the innovative Mechanized Division, as early as 1931 - achieving two-way communications with patrolling police cars several years before any other force.

During this era the force was famed for having very stringent height requirements significantly above other forces. Two officers PC Geoffrey Baker and PC Dennis 'Tug' Wilson were 'headhunted' specifically based on their height after being spotted by Popkess when they were Grenadier Guards acting as pallbearers at the funeral of King George VI. They stood at 6 foot 8 and 6 foot 8 1/2 respectively.

Amalgamation 
On 1 April 1968 as a result of the Police Act 1964 the force was required to amalgamate with the surrounding County police force and the forces took the name Nottinghamshire Combined Constabulary. This later changed to Nottinghamshire Constabulary and then Nottinghamshire Police.

References 

Police forces of England